Nicky's Family is a 2011 Czech docudrama directed by Matej Mináč. It is based on the work of Nicholas Winton prior to the outbreak of World War II.

Cast
 Ben Abeles as himself
 The Dalai Lama as himself
 Klára Issová as Mother
 Joe Schlesinger as himself
 Michal Slaný as Sir Nicholas Winton
 Nicholas Winton as himself

References

External links
 

2011 films
2011 documentary films
2010s Czech-language films
Documentary films about the Holocaust
Documentary films about refugees
Kindertransport
Czech World War II films
Czech documentary films